XS Junior League Football is a football video game for the PlayStation. It was released in 2003, by publisher XS Games and developer Wahoo Studios. The game was rereleased on October 11, 2011 for the PlayStation 3 by publisher SCEA. 

XS Junior League Football has cartoon-style graphics with 16 different characters; each with different skills, and several scenes to play at. The player plays with a team of four other players that partake in championships and tournaments to become the football champion.

References 

American football video games
2003 video games
PlayStation (console) games
PlayStation 3 games
PlayStation Network games
Video games developed in the United States
XS Games games
Wahoo Studios games